The Plaza Apartments is a historic five-story apartment building located in the Central neighborhood of Cleveland, Ohio, United States.  Built in 1901, it was designed by the architectural firm of Steffens, Searles & Hirsh, which built many middle-class apartment buildings in the Cleveland era around the turn of the twentieth century.  It features a primarily brick facade; stone appears in the exterior, and the foundation is stone.  It was added to the National Register of Historic Places on November 1, 1984, being included primarily for its architectural significance.  Other historic buildings surround the Plaza Apartments: it was added to the Register as part of the "Upper Prospect Multiple Resource Area," and the Register-listed Jeremiah Ensworth House is located next door.  Located just a quarter of a mile (400 m) from the Cleveland State University campus, the Plaza Apartments remains an active apartment building today, although named the "Plaza Suites."

The Plaza was noted as a creative center of Cleveland's arts and music scene during the 1970s and 80s.

References

Central, Cleveland
Residential buildings completed in 1901
Apartment buildings in Cleveland
National Register of Historic Places in Cleveland, Ohio
Residential buildings on the National Register of Historic Places in Ohio